Rémy Vogel (26 November 1960 – 17 October 2016) was a French international football defender. He played for RC Strasbourg and AS Monaco FC. He also played one international game for France, against the USSR in a Euro 88 qualifier in Moscow in September 1987. Vogel served as captain for Strasbourg between 1985 and 1987.

He died after a long illness on 17 October 2016 aged 55.

References

External links
 Profile
 Stats

1960 births
2016 deaths
French people of German descent
French footballers
France international footballers
Association football midfielders
RC Strasbourg Alsace players
AS Monaco FC players
Ligue 1 players
Footballers from Strasbourg